Xie or Hsieh may refer to:

Xie

People
Xie of Xia, legendary king of the Xia Dynasty
Xie of Shang (契), legendary nobleman
Xie, Marquis of Jin (th century BC), ruler of the State of Jin
King Xie of Zhou (BC)
Alexandra Kitchin (1864–1925), Lewis Carroll's friend and photo model nicknamed "Xie"
Xie (surname), derived from the state
Xie (surname 解)

Places

Xie (state), a state during the Zhou dynasty in modern Henan
Xie River (Brazil) in Amazonas in Brazil
Xie River (Xiè Shuǐ) in Shimen County, Hunan, in China
Xie River (Xié Chuān) in ancient China, near Shaanxi's Baoxie Plank Road
Xie River (Xiè Shuǐ) in China
Xie River (Xiè) in China

Xi'e
Xi'e (Xī'è), a region during the Qin, Han, and Jin dynasties in modern Hubei

XIE
Xavier Institute of Engineering, in Mumbai
X Image Extension